The Danish Division, short DDIV, is the only remaining military land division in Denmark. It was created on 1 January 1997 as the successor of Jutland Division. It is one of the now-two Divisions of Multinational Corps North East (MNC NE), the German-Danish-Polish Corps, the successor to the former German-Danish Allied Land Forces Schleswig-Holstein and Jutland (LANDJUT), a NATO Allied Forces Northern Europe formation.

Due to the Danish Defence agreement 2005–2009 Danish Division is currently undergoing major reorganisation, which will not only reduce the divisional strength but also transform it from the originally mobilization unit into a permanent and available formation. As a result of this, DDIV will possibly be affiliated with Allied Rapid Reaction Corps instead. The current structure consists of an armoured brigade, which is the main combat formation, and a training brigade, plus divisional troops. The armoured brigade consists of a single tank battalion, a reconnaissance battalion and two armoured infantry battalions.

List of Structure by year

2019- 
 Division Staff
Split HQ
 Eastern HQ element, in Ādaži, Latvia.
 Western HQ element, in Karup, Denmark
 Combat Support Battalion, Føringsstøtteregimentet in Ādaži

2011–2018 
 Staff (Haderslev)
 1.Brigade (Haderslev)
 1st Armoured Battalion, Jutland Dragoon Regiment (I/JDR Panserbataljon, Jydske Dragonregiment)
 2nd Armoured Infantry Battalion, Jutland Dragoon Regiment (II/JDR Panserinfanteribataljon, Jydske Dragonregiment)
 5th Training Battalion, Jutland Dragoon Regiment (V/JDR Uddannelsebatajlon, Jydske Dragonregiment)
 3rd Reconnaissance Battalion, Guard Hussar Regiment (III/GHR Opklaringsbataljon, Gardehusarregimentet)
 2.Brigade (Slagelse)
 1st Armoured Infantry Battalion, Royal Life Guards (I/LG Panserinfanteribataljon, Den Kongelige Livgarde)
 2nd Armoured Infantry Battalion, Royal Life Guards (II/LG Panserinfanteribataljon, Den Kongelige Livgarde)
 1st Armoured Infantry Battalion, Guard Hussar Regiment (I/GHR Panserinfanteribataljon, Gardehusarregimentet)
 2nd Armoured Infantry Battalion, Guard Hussar Regiment (II/GHR Panserinfanteribataljon, Gardehusarregimentet)
 5th Training Battalion, Guard Hussar Regiment (V/GHR Uddannelsebatajlon, Gardehusarregimentet)

2005–2011 
Danish Division (HQ Haderslev)
 1.Brigade
 Staff Company/1st Brigade, Signal Regiment (Stabskompagni/1. Brigade, Telegrafregimentet)
 1st Armoured Battalion, Jutland Dragoon Regiment (I/JDR Panserbataljon, Jydske Dragonregiment)
 1st Armoured Infantry Battalion, Royal Life Guards (I/LG Panserinfanteribataljon, Den Kongelige Livgarde)
 1st Armoured Infantry Battalion, Guard Hussar Regiment (I/GHR Panserinfanteribataljon, Gardehusarregimentet)
 3rd Reconnaissance Battalion, Guard Hussar Regiment (III/GHR Opklaringsbataljon, Gardehusarregimentet)
 1st Artillery Battalion, Danish Artillery Regiment (1 Artilleriafdeling, Danske Artilleriregiment)
 1st Armored Engineer Company, Engineer Regiment (1 Panseringeniørkompagni, Danske Artilleriregiment)
 1st Logistics Battalion, Logistics Regiment (1 Logistikbataljon, Trænregimentet)
 1st Military Police Company, Logistics Regiment (1 Militærpolitikompagni, Trænregimentet)
 2.Brigade
 2nd Training Battalion, Signal Regiment (II. Uddannelsbataljon, Telegrafregimentet)
 2nd Training Battalion, Jutland Dragoon Regiment (II/JDR Uddannelsebatajlon, Jydske Dragonregiment)
 2nd Training Battalion, Royal Life Guards (II/LG Uddannelsebatajlon, Den Kongelige Livgarde)
 2nd Training Battalion, Guard Hussar Regiment (II/GHR Uddannelsebatajlon, Gardehusarregimentet)
 4th Training Battalion, Guard Hussar Regiment (IV/GHR Uddannelsebatajlon, Gardehusarregimentet)
 2nd Training Battalion, Danish Artillery Regiment (2 Uddannelseafdeling, Danske Artilleriregiment)
 2nd Training Battalion, Engineer Regiment (2 Uddannelsbataljon, Ingeniørregimentet)
 2nd Training Battalion, Logistics Regiment (2 Uddannelsbataljon, Trænregimentet)
 2nd Military Police Company, Logistics Regiment (2 Militærpolitikompagni, Trænregimentet)
 Divisional Troops
 Command & Target Acquisition battalion, Danish Artillery Regiment (3 Førings- og Målopklaringsafdeling, Danske Artilleriregiment)
 Missile Air Defence battalion, Danish Artillery Regiment (Luftværsmissilafdeling, Danske Artilleriregiment)(disbanded and merged into Command & Target Acquisition battalion in 2010, rest of Battalion transferred to Royal Danish Air Force)
 3rd Engineer Battalion, Engineer Regiment (3 Ingeniørbataljon, Ingeniørregimentet)
 3rd Signal Battalion, Signal Regiment (3 Telegrafbataljon, Telegrafregimentet)
 3rd Electronic Warfare Company, Signal Regiment (2 Electronic Warfare kompagni)
 CIMIC Company, Danish Artillery Regiment (CIMIC kompagni, Danske Artilleriregiment )
 3rd Military Police Company, Logistics Regiment (3 Militærpolitikompagni, Trænregimentet)

 2000–2005 
Danish Division (HQ Fredericia)  
3rd Signal Battalion (support and run Division HQ)
1st Jyske Brigade (HQ Fredericia)
1st Staff Company/TGR,
I/PLR Mechanised Infantry Battalion  
II/PLR MechInfantry Battalion
I/JDR Armoured Battalion
1st Reconnaissance Squadron/JDR
3rd Artillery Battalion/DAR (Armoured/Selfpropelled)
1st Armoured Engineer Company
7th Logistic Battalion
1st MP detachment
3rd Jyske Brigade (HQ Haderslev)
3rd Staff Company/TGR
III/PLR MechInfantry Battalion
IV/GHR MechInfantry Battalion
V/GHR Armoured Battalion
3rd Reconnaissance Squadron/JDR
7th Artillery Battalion/DAR (Armoured/Selfpropelled)
3rd Armoured Engineer Company
1st Logistic Battalion
3rd MP detachment
1st Seeland Brigade (HQ Slagelse)
4th Staff Company/GHR
I/LG MechInfantry Battalion
III/LG MechInfantry Battalion
I/GHR Armoured Battalion
4th Reconnaissance Squadron/GHR
1st Artillery Battalion/KAR (Armoured/Selfpropelled)
4th Armoured Engineer Company
2nd Logistic Battalion
4th MP detachment
Rear Combatgroup (HQ Skive)
2nd Staff Company/PLR
V/PLR MechInfantry Battalion
VI/PLR Infantry Battalion
2nd Reconnaissance Squadron/JDR
? Logistic Battalion
2nd MP detachment
Divisional Troops
II/JDR Armoured Battalion
V/JDR Reconnaissance Battalion (Armoured)
Anti-tank Helicopter Company
Patrol Company/PLR (Long Range/Light Reconnaissance)
Division Artillery (HQ Sjælsmark)
Staff&Target-Acquisition Battery/KAR
2nd Artillery Battalions/KAR (towed)
23rd Artillery Battalions/DAR (towed)
24th Artillery Battalions/DAR (towed)
18th Rocket-launch Battery/KAR (Armoured/Selfpropelled)
14th Anti-aircraft rocket Battalion/DAR
3rd Engineering Battalion
3rd Electronic Warfare Company
3rd Logistic Support Battalion
Transport Company (Heavy transport)
3rd Military Police Company

 1997–2000 
Danish Division (HQ Fredericia)  
3rd Signal Battalion (support and run Division HQ)
1st Jyske Brigade (HQ Fredericia)
1st Staff Company/TGR,
I/DRLR MechInfantry Battalion
I/SLFR MechInfantry Battalion
III/JDR Armoured Battalion
1st Reconnaissance Squadron/JDR
3rd Artillery Battalion/NJAR (Armoured/Selfpropelled)
1st Armoured Engineer Company
7th Logistic Battalion
1st MP detachment
3rd Jyske Brigade (HQ Haderslev)
3rd Staff Company/SLFR
I/PLR MechInfantry Battalion
II/PLR MechInfantry Battalion
I/JDR Armoured Battalion
3rd Reconnaissance Squadron/JDR
7th Artillery Battalion/SJAR (Armoured/Selfpropelled)
3rd Armoured Engineer Company
1st Logistic Battalion
3rd MP detachment
1st Sjællandske Brigade (HQ Ringsted)
4th Staff Company/SJLR
II/DLR MechInfantry Battalion
IV/GHR MechInfantry Battalion
I/GHR Armoured Battalion
4th Reconnaissance Squadron/GHR
1st Artillery Battalion/KAR (Armoured/Selfpropelled)
4th Armoured Engineer Company
2nd Logistic Battalion
4th MP detachment
Divisional Troops
II/JDR Armoured Battalion
V/JDR Reconnaissance Battalion (Armoured)
Anti-tank Helicopter Company
Patrol Company/DRLR (Long Range/Light Reconnaissance)
Division Artillery (HQ Skive)
Staff&Target-Acquisition Battery/NJAR
23rd Artillery Battalions/NJAR (towed)
24th Artillery Battalions/SJAR (towed)
18th Rocket-launch Battery/NJAR (Armoured/Selfpropelled)
14th Anti-aircraft rocket Battalion/SJAR
3rd Engineering Battalion
3rd Electronic Warfare Company
3rd Logistic Support Battalion
Transport Company (Heavy transport)
3rd Military Police Company

 Equipment from 1997–2005 
As a MechInfantry Division, Danish Division contained

Trucks and Vehicles (numbers unknown)
MAN trucks in different size and types (Staff, Logistik, Signals, Heavy transport, etc.)
GD240/290 in different types (CO's, XO's, Artillery Observer, Maintain, Liassion, Signals, MP's etc.) 
MAGIRUS trucks in different size and types (Command post, Supply, Signals, Artillery, etc.)
VW Transporter in different types (Liassion, Supply, Maintain, etc.)
BMV motorcykel (Ordonace and MP's)

 References 

 Danish Division'', Haderslev Kaserne, 2007. A presentation of the Danish Division in English.

External links 
 Homepage of Danske Division (in Danish).

Army units and formations of Denmark
Infantry divisions
Military units and formations established in 1997